Unbroken: Path to Redemption is a 2018 American Christian drama film directed by Harold Cronk, and acts as a sequel to the 2014 film Unbroken, although Legendary Pictures was not involved and none of the original cast or crew returns except the producer Matthew Baer, and actors Vincenzo Amato and Maddalena Ischiale. The film chronicles Louis Zamperini following his return from World War II, his personal struggles to adjust back to civilian life and his eventual conversion to evangelical Christianity after attending one of Billy Graham's church revivals. The film stars Samuel Hunt as Zamperini, Merritt Patterson, Vincenzo Amato, Vanessa Bell Calloway, Bobby Campo, Bob Gunton, Maddalena Ischiale, David Sakurai and Gary Cole, as well as evangelist Will Graham portraying his grandfather.

It was theatrically released by Pure Flix Entertainment in the United States on September 14, 2018. It received generally negative reviews from critics, who criticized it as "a dull drama", but was given high ratings by audiences and grossed just over $6 million against its $6 million production budget.

Plot summary
Based on Laura Hillenbrand’s bestselling book, the film begins where the movie Unbroken concludes, sharing the next chapter of the true story of Olympian and World War II veteran Louis Zamperini.

Haunted by nightmares of his torment, Louie sees himself as anything but a hero. Then, he meets Cynthia, a young woman who captures his eye—and his heart.

Louie’s quest for revenge drives him deeper into despair, putting the couple on the brink of divorce until Cynthia experiences Billy Graham’s 1949 Los Angeles Crusade, where both find faith in Jesus Christ, a renewed commitment to their marriage, and Louie finds forgiveness for his wartime captors.

Cast
 Samuel Hunt as Louis Zamperini, a former Olympian, World War 2 Bombardier, and later former POW who has recently been rescued and sent back home, and currently haunted by his past. He decides to seek God's grace and forgiveness in Jesus Christ. He was previously portrayed by Jack O'Connell in the original film.
 Merritt Patterson as Cynthia Applewhite-Zamperini, Louis' wife
 Vincenzo Amato as Anthony Zamperini, Louis' father. 
 Vanessa Bell Calloway as Lila Burkholder
 Bobby Campo as Pete Zamperini, Louis' brother 
 Bob Gunton as Major Zeigler
 Maddalena Ischiale as Louise Zamperini
 David Sakurai as Mutsuhiro "The Bird" Watanabe, a sadistic Japanese warden and Louis' torturer who appears in flashbacks. He was previously portrayed by Japanese musician Miyavi in the original film.
 Gary Cole as George Bailey
 Will Graham as Billy Graham, an American pastor who changes Zamperini's life by having him hear the gospel. Actor Will Graham is the real-life grandson of Billy Graham.
 David DeLuise as Howard Lambert
 Gianna Simone as Sylvia Zamperini, Louis' sister. She was previously portrayed by Savannah Lamble in the original film.
 April Bowlby as Cecy Phillips

Release
The film was originally going to be released on October 5, 2018, but was moved up from its original release to September 14, 2018.

Box office
In the United States and Canada, Unbroken: Path to Redemption was released alongside White Boy Rick, A Simple Favor and The Predator, and was projected to gross $2–6 million from 1,620 theaters in its opening weekend. It ended up debuting to just $2.2 million, finishing tenth at the box office. It dropped 40% in its second weekend to $1.3 million, finishing 12th.

Critical response
The website's critics consensus reads: "Unbroken: Path to Redemption overestimates the power of its inspirational real-life story, settling for a dull drama that too often preaches to the choir." According to Metacritic, which assigned weighted average score of 38 out of 100 based on seven critics, the film received "generally unfavorable reviews". Audiences polled by CinemaScore gave the film an average grade of "A" on an A+ to F scale, while PostTrak reported that filmgoers gave it 4 out of 5 stars.

See also
Captured by Grace, a documentary about Louis Zamperini.

References

External links
 
 
 
 
 

2018 films
American biographical films
American historical films
Drama films based on actual events
Films about Christianity
Films based on biographies
Films directed by Harold Cronk
American sequel films
World War II films based on actual events
2010s English-language films
2010s American films